Sabina Hafner (sometimes misspelled Sabrina Hafner, born 10 May 1984) is a Swiss bobsledder who competed from 2003 to 2012. She won two medals in the mixed bobsleigh-skeleton team event at the FIBT World Championships with a silver in 2009 and a bronze in 2007.

She won the World Junior Championship three times (2007, 2009, 2010) and the Swiss Championships six times (2005, 2006, 2009, 2010, 2011, 2016).

Her biggest success is the second place at the European Championship in Igls (AUT) in 2010.

Hafner also competed in two Winter Olympics, earning her best finish of tenth in the two-woman event at Turin in 2006.

References

Official Website

1984 births
Living people
Swiss female bobsledders
Bobsledders at the 2006 Winter Olympics
Bobsledders at the 2010 Winter Olympics
Bobsledders at the 2018 Winter Olympics
Olympic bobsledders of Switzerland
People from Liestal